The Design 1018 ship (full name Emergency Fleet Corporation Design 1018) was a steel-hulled cargo ship design approved for production by the United States Shipping Boards Emergency Fleet Corporation (EFT) in World War I. They were referred to as the "Sun-type" as they were built by Sun Shipbuilding & Drydock Co. in Chester, Pennsylvania. 4 ships were completed for the USSB in late 1919 and through 1920. An additional ship was completed in 1920 for a private shipping company.

References

Bibliography

External links
 EFC Design 1018: Illustrations

Standard ship types of the United States